Conjugated estrogens/norgestrel (CEEs/NG), sold under the brand name Prempak-C among others, is a combination of conjugated estrogens (CEEs), an estrogen, and norgestrel (NG), a progestin, which is used in menopausal hormone therapy in postmenopausal women. It is taken by mouth and contains 0.625 or 1.25 mg CEEs and 150 μg NG (or 75 μg levonorgestrel) per tablet. The medication is no longer marketed.

See also
 List of combined sex-hormonal preparations § Estrogens and progestogens

References

Abandoned drugs
Combined estrogen–progestogen formulations